The Crater Lake Monster is a 1977 B-movie horror film directed by William R. Stromberg for Crown International Pictures, and starring Richard Cardella.

As people are attacked by the monster, the Sheriff (Cardella) investigates along with a group of scientists in order to stop the creature.

Plot

In Crater Lake, Northern California, Dr. Richard Calkins is informed by his colleague Dan Turner that he and his girlfriend Susan Patterson have made an incredible discovery in a nearby cave system. The three head down and discover a system of cave drawings, including what appears to be a depiction of people fighting off a Plesiosaurus, thus providing evidence that dinosaurs existed at the same time as humans did. However, a flaming meteorite crashes into the lake just overhead, resulting in a cave-in that destroys the cave system and the drawings, while the three scientists are barely able to escape alive. The local sheriff, Steve Hanson, sees the meteorite crash and radios in the incident before continuing on his patrol.

Several months later, Sheriff Hanson meets with the three scientists to go search for the meteorite. Turner and Patterson dive down to the bottom of the lake, only to find out that the meteorite is still too hot to recover and has resulted in the entire lake becoming significantly warmer than before, rising to approximately ninety degrees. Somewhere else on the lake, a birdwatcher is setting up his equipment when the monster suddenly rises out of the water, moves onto the shore, and kills him.

Two friends, Arnie Chabot and Mitch Kowalski, running low on money, decide to start a boat rental service. Their first customer is U.S. senator Jack Fuller, who rents a rowboat for a quick fishing trip for $20. However, he is attacked and killed by the monster. Arnie and Mitch see the empty boat drifting in the middle of the lake and go out to retrieve it, finding only some large blood stains inside the boat. They bring the boat back to shore as evidence for the Sheriff. Then the sheriff finds many dead animals, and takes the case.

Some time later, a performer named Ross Conway and his wife Paula are on their way to a show when their car suddenly begins to break down. They stop at a gas station and learn from the mechanic that their car won't be repaired for several more days. The attendant tells them that the fastest method of transportation at this point is by boat across the lake. The couple heads down to Arnie and Mitch's dock to rent a motorboat for $25 and head out. While out on the lake, they are attacked by the monster, but manage to outrun it due to the boat's motor and run it aground. When the monster pursues them onto the shore, Ross empties the can of gasoline into the boat and sets it ablaze, fending off the monster.

Arnie and Mitch, as they walk away from renting the boat out to the couple, begin to argue about their boat-renting service. Mitch claims that he is tired of being bossed around by Arnie, and the two eventually fight. Their scuffle leads to the water, where the two discover the severed head of Fuller floating in the lake just as the Sheriff arrives. As he takes in the head for evidence, he orders them to stay away from the lake, and to not use any more boats. Realizing that the couple from earlier is still out there, Arnie and Mitch head out in another boat to search for them. They eventually discover the charred remains of the motorboat and the distraught couple, both too mortified to explain what happened to them. The couple is taken away in an ambulance, and the Sheriff issues a stern warning for Arnie and Mitch to not head back out onto the lake.

At the local diner, the sheriff spots a man who is wanted for armed robbery in the nearest town. During the crime, the clerk and another customer were killed. The sheriff pursues the suspect into the forest. After the suspect drives his car off a cliff and jumps out, the sheriff pursues him on foot. The chase eventually leads them down to the shore, where the Sheriff shoots the suspect in the knee, before stopping to hide behind a tree and reload his weapon. During the brief pause, the monster snatches the suspect, dragging him under the water. The sheriff does not hear the attack happen, but he discovers a large blood stain on a nearby rock. Meanwhile, Calkins's autopsy report comes in, and the coroner notifies the sheriff that the wounds were caused by an animal's teeth and that the attacking animal is not only of a significant size, but also lives in the lake.

When the sheriff returns the next day to the location where the robbery suspect went missing, he finds several massive footprints before the monster suddenly emerges. He fires all six shots in his revolver at it, before jumping into his car and driving away. He tells Calkins, Turner, and Patterson about the incident, and his description of the monster fits that of a plesiosaurus. While the three scientists are excited at the idea of a living dinosaur in the lake, the sheriff is determined to kill it before more lives are put at risk.

The sheriff, Calkins, Turner, and Patterson host a town meeting in the diner the next day, informing the town of the danger and what they plan to do to stop the monster. Arnie and Mitch ultimately take the scientists' side in favor of keeping the monster alive, saying it'll bring in a significant amount of money for the town. However, a man named Ferguson is attacked by the monster and barely manages to make it to safety inside the diner. The Sheriff, Turner, Patterson, Arnie, and Mitch all head outside to confront the monster, which is just outside the barricade of farming vehicles and a wall of hay bales. The Sheriff starts up a bulldozer, but Arnie attempts to stop him at gunpoint, saying that the monster must live. The Sheriff convinces him that nothing will stop the monster without killing it, and Arnie jumps in the back, shotgun at the ready. As the monster draws closer, Arnie panics and attempts to flee, only to be caught and killed by the monster. The Sheriff slams into the monster with the bulldozer, causing it to drop Arnie's corpse. When it reaches its head down to try to pick up Arnie's body again, the Sheriff drives the bulldozer forward and repeatedly slams into the monster's neck, finally killing it.

In the aftermath of the battle, the Sheriff, Calkins, Turner, Patterson, and Mitch all mourn Arnie's death, with Mitch vowing to continue the boat rental service that he and Arnie started, softly repeating "our boats...our boats."

Cast
 Richard Cardella as Sheriff Steve Hanson
 Glenn Roberts as Arnie Chabot
 Mark Siegel as Mitch Kowalski
 Bob Hyman as Richard Calkins
 Richard Garrison as Dan Turner
 Kacey Cobb as Susan Patterson
 Michael Hoover as Ross Conway
 Suzanne Lewis as Paula Conway
 Marv Eliot as Senator Jack Fuller
 Garry Johnston as Blackmailer
 Susy Claycomb as waitress
 Jim Goeppinger as Villager

Production

The film suffered from financing and publication problems with Crown International, as Cardella recounts:

There was no post work done on the film resulting in day for night scenes being just day.

Parts of the movie were filmed on location at Huntington Lake, California, and Palomar Mountain, California.

Reception

George R. Reis from DVD Drive-In called it "one of the worst giant monster flicks of all time". Buzz McClain from Allmovie wrote, "With virtually no budget (not even for a competent tripod to hold the camera steady) and using amateur actors, the movie employs the most laughable devices to render the impression of a raging dinosaur—an immobile rubber head, for instance—and the most unpredictable shuffling of scenes of tension and humor." Andrew Smith from Popcorn Pictures gave the film a score of 1 out of 10, writing, "The Crater Lake Monster is nearly as bad as its reputation claims, but the brief stop motion special effects are worth one look... It’s just a shame that these effects are wasted in this hokey micro budget film, and are not displayed in something bigger budgeted and more professional." Keith Bailey from Radio Times gave it 1/5 stars, calling it "so slow and shoddy, it makes some of the worst 1950s monster movies look like masterpieces".

See also
 List of stop motion films
 List of monster movies

References

External links
 
 
 
 
 

1977 films
1977 horror films
1970s fantasy films
1970s monster movies
American monster movies
Films about dinosaurs
1970s English-language films
Films using stop-motion animation
American natural horror films
Plesiosaurs in fiction
1970s American films
Films shot in San Diego